Jörg Nürnberger (born 17 April 1967) is a German lawyer and politician of the Social Democratic Party (SPD) who has been serving as a member of the Bundestag since 2021.

Political career
Nürnberger became a member of the Bundestag in the 2021 elections, representing the Hof district. In parliament, he has since been serving on the Defence Committee and the Committee on European Affairs.

In addition to his committee assignments, Nürnberger is part of the Parliamentary Friendship Group for Relations with Slovakia, the Czech Republic and Hungary.

References 

Living people
1967 births
Social Democratic Party of Germany politicians
Members of the Bundestag 2021–2025
21st-century German politicians